Ryan Joseph O'Malley (born April 9, 1980) is a former Major League Baseball pitcher.

O'Malley made his major league debut for the Cubs on August 16, 2006, against the Houston Astros. He pitched eight innings, giving up five hits, six walks, two strikeouts and no runs in a 1–0 win. In his next start, he pitched four and two-thirds innings before leaving with a strained left elbow. He was activated from the disabled list on September 8, 2006.

On January 9, 2007, the Cubs announced that O'Malley would be among 11 non-roster players invited to spring training camp in Mesa, Arizona.

In February 2008, O'Malley was signed by the Schaumburg Flyers of the independent Northern League, but before appearing in a game for them, he left to sign a minor league contract with the Chicago White Sox. He became a free agent at the end of the season.

On December 2, 2009, O'Malley was named the pitching coach for the Arizona League Rangers.

External links

1980 births
Living people
Chicago Cubs players
Baseball players from Illinois
Major League Baseball pitchers
Sportspeople from Springfield, Illinois
Boise Hawks players
Lansing Lugnuts players
Daytona Cubs players
Iowa Cubs players
West Tennessee Diamond Jaxx players
Tennessee Smokies players
Birmingham Barons players
Memphis Tigers baseball players
Lincoln Land Loggers baseball players